Enzeli (foaled 5 April 1995) is a retired Irish-bred Thoroughbred racehorse and stallion. He won Ascot Gold Cup in 1999.

Background
Enzeli was bred at the Aga Khan's Studs and foaled on 5 April 1995. He was sired by Kahyasi. Enzeli's dam is Ebaziya, by Darshaan. Enzeli is the Ebaziya's second foal. His half-sister is Estimate, winner of  the 2013 Gold Cup for Queen Elizabeth II. Enzeli has a lean and lengthy appearance.

Enzeli was trained by John Oxx. He was sold for nearly 200.000 pounds to Australian businesspeople Kerry Packer and Lloyd Williams in 2000. Then he was trained by Myles Plumb.

Racing career
At 3 years Enzeli won the Leopardstown November Handicap in 1998. He also won the Saval Beg Stakes and the Gold Cup in 1999. At the Gold Cup he was ridden by Johnny Murtagh and won the race with time of 4:18.85, being Ireland's first winner of the cup since 1969. At 5 years Enzeli won the Doncaster Cup again with Murtagh. In 2000, he took part in the Melbourne Cup.

Assessment
In 1999, Enzeli was rated as one of the top-rated stayers in Europe together with Kayf Tara.

Pedigree

References

1995 racehorse births
Racehorses bred in Ireland
Racehorses trained in Ireland
Thoroughbred family 13-c